Lee Camp (born July 21, 1980) is an American writer, comedian, podcaster, news journalist and news commentator. As a television host he presented the show Redacted Tonight for several years on the Russian state-funded network RT America until it was shut down after Russia's invasion of Ukraine in February 2022. In July 2022 he started a new show, Most Censored News with Lee Camp with MintPress News.

Early life 
Camp was born in Richmond, Virginia to Laurie Smith Camp who was a federal judge. and lived in Bethesda, Maryland until 1989. His father is a psychoanalyst who served 20 years in the United States military as a doctor, and his mother is a social worker. In 1989, the family moved to Richmond, Virginia, where Camp stayed until he went to college at the University of Virginia in Charlottesville, Virginia.

At the University of Virginia, he won a competition to become the humor columnist for the school newspaper The Cavalier Daily. He began performing stand-up comedy on his 19th birthday at an open-mic night at Matt's Pub in Richmond.

Career 
Camp's first book was Neither Sophisticated Nor Intelligent, a collection of his best humor columns from The Cavalier Daily, the University of Virginia newspaper. With Nick Alexander and Alan Lord, Camp co-authored the 2005 BIGfib Book of Bollocks, a collection of stories from the satirical website BIGfib.com. Camp has been a contributor to The Onion since February 2009 and was a staff comedy writer for The Huffington Post for ten months. He wrote and hosted OnDemand's "The Movie Loft" for three months in 2009.

In 2017, Camp and Eleanor Goldfield created the Common Censored podcast, which focuses on grassroots activism issues.

RT America
Camp was the host and head writer of the weekly comedy news show Redacted Tonight with Lee Camp, which aired on RT America. Jason Zinoman wrote in The New York Times that his appearance on the channel: "raises questions about the comedian’s independence." He told Rachel Manteuffel of The Washington Post Magazine that the Russian government funds his show. When asked about advertising, he said, "one of the reasons I'm at RT America is because there’s no advertising. If there were advertising, no channel really wants someone who goes after corporations as much as I do."

After RT America shut down in the wake of Russia's invasion of Ukraine, Camp blamed the "U.S. government war machine" for the end of the network. Following the closure of RT, Lee started a new show, Most Censored News with Lee Camp; featured with MintPress News, beginning in July, 2022.

Discography

DVD
 Sometimes Funny Hurts (2007)
 Lee Camp Live At Comix (2009)
 We Are Nothing (2014)

CD
 Chaos for the Weary (Stand Up! Records, 2011)
 Pepper Spray the Tears Away (Stand Up! Records, 2012)

Filmography

Bibliography
 Bullet Points and Punch Lines: The Most Important Commentary Ever Written on the Epic American Tragicomedy, PM Press, 2020.

References

External links 
 Lee Camp's official website

1980 births
21st-century American comedians
21st-century American Jews
21st-century American male writers
American atheists
American columnists
American comedy writers
American democratic socialists
American humorists
American male film actors
American male television actors
American male television writers
American media critics
American podcasters
American stand-up comedians
American television hosts
American television writers
Comedians from New York City
Jewish American comedy writers
Jewish American male comedians
Living people
Male actors from New York City
Male actors from Washington, D.C.
People from Bethesda, Maryland
RT (TV network) people
Stand Up! Records artists